Jurjevac Punitovački is a village in Croatia, part of the municipality of Punitovci, population 787 (2011).

References

Populated places in Osijek-Baranja County